Imangi Studios is an American  independent video game company best known for creating the top free iOS, Android, and Windows Phone game Temple Run. Founded by husband-and-wife team Natalia Luckyanova and Keith Shepherd, the company also has an artist, Kiril Tchangov.

Games developed

Recognition
Pocket Gamer placed Imangi at rank #13 in their Top 50 Developers of 2013 list and rank #36 for Top 50 Developers of 2014. New York Times reported that Imangi Studios had become more popular than Zynga.

References 

Video game companies of the United States
Video game companies established in 2008
2008 establishments in North Carolina